Losorion or Lysiris, was a Byzantine (Roman) fortification on the eastern Black Sea coast, in Lazica in what is now Batumi, western Georgia. In the 6th century, it was constructed by Byzantine emperor Justinian I, and due to its strategic location became a battleground of the 541–562 Lazic War between Rome and Sasanian Persia (Iran). It was identified with the Medieval fortress of Batumi, known as Tamaris Tsikhe, i.e. Queen Tamar's Castle.

References

External links 
 The fortress Tamara or Tamaris-tsikhe

Lazica
Buildings of Justinian I
History of Adjara
Roman–Sasanian Wars
Roman fortifications in Georgia (country)